Gundlachtudora is a genus of land snails with an operculum, terrestrial gastropod mollusks in the family Pomatiidae.

Species 
Species within the genus Gundlachtudora include:
 Gundlachtudora decolorata (Gundlach in Pfeiffer, 1859)

References 

Pomatiidae